This is a list of notable events in music that took place in the year 1947.

Specific locations
1947 in British music
1947 in Norwegian music

Specific genres
1947 in country music
1947 in jazz

Events
June 11 – 15 – First Llangollen International Musical Eisteddfod is held in Wales.
August 7 – Carlo Bergonzi makes his professional debut as Schaunard in La bohème at the Arena Argentina in Catania.
October – Enrico De Angelis leaves Quartetto Cetra to join the army. Lucia Mannucci replaces him.
Jack Brymer becomes principal clarinettist of the Royal Philharmonic Orchestra.
Patti Page signs with Mercury.
Frankie Laine earns the first of his 21 gold records.
Kay Starr signs with Capitol.
George Jones begins performing.
Ernesto Bonino embarks on his Latin American tour.
The Amadeus Quartet is founded, as the Brainin Quartet.
Bernard Greenhouse and John Serry Sr. appear in Studio One on the CBS network.

Albums released
Glenn Miller Masterpieces, Vol. 2 – Glenn Miller
Music Out of the Moon – Les Baxter
The Jolson Album Vol. 1 – Al Jolson
St. Patrick's Day – Bing Crosby
Accordion Capers – The Biviano Rhythm Sexteete with John Serry Sr. & Tony Mottola

Top popular records of 1947

For each Year in Music (beginning 1940) and Year in Country Music (beginning 1939), a comprehensive Year End Top Records section can be found at mid-page (popular), and on the Country page. These charts are meant to replace the charts Billboard prints at the end of each year, because they are better. Keep reading.

The charts are compiled from data published by Billboard magazine, using their formulas, with slight modifications. Most important, there are no songs missing or truncated by Billboard's holiday deadline. Each year, records included enter the charts between the prior November and early December. Each week, fifteen points are awarded to the number one record, then nine points for number two, eight points for number three, and so on. This system rewards songs that reach the highest positions, as well as those that had the longest chart runs. This is our adjustment to Mr. Whitburn's formula, which places no. 1 records on top, then no 2 and so on, ordered by weeks at that position. This allows a record with 4 weeks at no. 1 that only lasted 6 weeks to be rated very high. Here, the total points of a song's complete chart run determines its position. Our chart has more songs, more weeks and may look nothing like Billboard's, but it comes from the exact same surveys. 

Before the Hot100 was implemented in 1958, Billboard magazine measured a record's performance with three charts, 'Best-Selling Popular Retail Records', 'Records Most-Played On the Air' or 'Records Most Played By Disk Jockeys' and 'Most-Played Juke Box Records'. As Billboard did starting in the 1940s, the three totals for each song are  combined, with that number determining the final year-end rank. For example, 1944's "A Hot Time in the Town of Berlin" by Bing and the Andrews Sisters finished at no. 19, despite six weeks at no. 1 on the 'Most-Played Juke Box Records'(JB) chart. It scored 126 points, to go with its Best-Selling chart (BS) total of 0. Martha Tilton's version of "I'll Walk Alone" peaked at no. 4 on the Juke Box chart, which only totalled 65 points, but her BS total was also 65, for a final total of 130, ranking no. 18. Examples like this can be found in "The Billboard" magazine up to 1958. By the way, the 'Records Most-Played On the Air' chart didn't begin until January 1945, which is why we only had two sub-totals.

Our rankings are based on Billboard data, but we also present info on recording and release dates, global sales totals, RIAA and BPI certifications and other awards. Rankings from other genres like 'Hot R&B/Hip-Hop Songs' or 'Most Played Juke Box Race Records', Country charts including 'Most Played Juke Box Folk (Hillbilly) Records', 'Cashbox magazine', and other sources are presented if they exist. We supplement our info with reliable data from the "Discography of American Historical Recordings" website, Joel Whitburn's Pop Memories 1890-1954 and other sources as specified.

Billboard Most-Played Juke Box Race Records

The following songs appeared in The Billboard's Most-Played Juke Box Race Records chart, starting November 1946 through November 1947. Each week ten points were awarded to the number one record, then four points for number two, three points for number three, and so on. This system rewards songs that reach the highest positions, as well as those that had the longest chart runs. Also see Billboard Most-Played Race Records of 1947.

Published popular music
 "Across the Alley From the Alamo", words and music: Joe Green
"Afraid to Fall in Love" w. Ralph Blane m. Harry Warren. Introduced by Mickey Rooney and Gloria DeHaven in the 1948 film Summer Holiday
 "Ah, But It Happens" w. William Dunham m. Walter Kent
 "Almost Like Being in Love" w. Alan Jay Lerner m. Frederick Loewe. Introduced by David Brooks and Marion Bell in the musical Brigadoon. Performed in the 1954 film version by Gene Kelly.
 "And Mimi" w.m. Jimmy Kennedy & Nat Simon
 "Apalachicola F.L.A." w. Johnny Burke m. Jimmy Van Heusen. Introduced by Bob Hope and Bing Crosby in the film Road to Rio
 "An Apple Blossom Wedding" w.m. Jimmy Kennedy & Nat Simon
 "April in Portugal" w. Jose Galhardo (Port) Jimmy Kennedy (Eng) m. Raul Ferrão
 "Autumn Leaves" ("Les Feuilles Mortes") w.(Eng) Johnny Mercer (Fr) Jacques Prévert m. Joseph Kosma
 "Ballerina" w.m. Bob Russell & Carl Sigman
 "Beg Your Pardon" w.m. Francis Craig & Beasley Smith
 "Big Brass Band from Brazil" w.m. Bob Hilliard & Carl Sigman
 "Bloop Bleep" w.m. Frank Loesser
 "Blue Shadows on the Trail" w. Johnny Lange m. Elliot Daniel
 "Bouquet of Roses" w.m. Steve Nelson & Bob Hilliard
 "Busy Doing Nothing" w. Johnny Burke m. Jimmy Van Heusen
 "But Beautiful" w. Johnny Burke m. Jimmy Van Heusen
 "Buttons and Bows" w.m. Jay Livingston & Ray Evans
 "C'est si bon" w.(Eng) Jerry Seelen (Fr) André Hornez m. Henri Betti
 "Chi-Baba, Chi-Baba" w.m. Mack David, Jerry Livingston & Al Hoffman
 "Cigarettes, Whisky, And Wild, Wild Women" w.m. Tim Spencer
 "Civilization" w.m. Bob Hilliard & Carl Sigman. Introduced by Elaine Stritch in the revue Angel in the Wings
 "Clancy Lowered the Boom" w.m. Hy Heath & Johnny Lange
 "Come to Me, Bend to Me" w. Alan Jay Lerner m. Frederick Loewe
 "Come to the Mardi Gras" w. (Eng) Ervin Drake & Jimmy Shirl (Port) Max Bulhoes & Milton De Oliviera m. Max Bulhoes & Milton De Oliviera
 "Confess" w.m. Bennie Benjamin & George David Weiss
 "Cuanto Le Gusta" w. Ray Gilbert m. Gabriel Ruiz
 "Don't Smoke in Bed" w.m. Willard Robison
 "Don't Telephone, Don't Telegraph, Tell a Woman" w.m. Al Stewart & Tex Williams
 "Down by the Station" adapted from a children's song by Lee Ricks & Slim Gaillard
 "Down the Old Spanish Trail" Kenneth Leslie-Smith & Jimmy Kennedy
 "The Dream of Olwen" w. Winifred May m. Charles Williams
 "The Egg and I", w. Bert Kalmar, Al Jolson, and Harry Akst m. Harry Ruby
 "Everybody Loves Somebody" w. Irving Taylor m. Ken Lane
 "Everybody's Gonna Have A Wonderful Time Up There" Lee Roy Abernathy
 "Ev'ry Day I Love You" w. Sammy Cahn m. Jule Styne
 "A Fella with an Umbrella" w.m. Irving Berlin
 "For Every Man There's a Woman" w. Leo Robin m. Harold Arlen. Introduced by Tony Martin in the 1948 film Casbah
"Four Brothers" by Jimmy Giuffre
 "Fun And Fancy Free" w.m. Bennie Benjamin & George David Weiss
 "Galway Bay" w.m. Dr Arthur Colahan
 "The Gentleman Is A Dope" w. Oscar Hammerstein II m. Richard Rodgers
 "Good Rockin' Tonight" w.m. Roy Brown
 "Haunted Heart" w. Howard Dietz m. Arthur Schwartz
 "The Heather On The Hill" w. Alan Jay Lerner m. Frederick Loewe
 "Here Comes Santa Claus" w.m. Gene Autry & Oakley Haldeman
 "Here I'll Stay" w. Alan Jay Lerner m. Kurt Weill
 "Hooray For Love" w. Leo Robin m. Harold Arlen. Introduced by Tony Martin and Yvonne DeCarlo in the 1948 film Casbah
 "A Hundred And Sixty Acres" w.m. David Kapp
 "Hurry On Down" w.m. Nellie Lutcher
 "I Like'em Fat Like That" w.m. Claude Demetrius, Louis Jordan, J. Mayo Williams
 "I Still Get Jealous" w. Sammy Cahn m. Jule Styne
 "I Tipped My Hat And Slowly Rode Away" w.m. Larry Marks & Dick Charles
 "I Wish I Didn't Love You So" w.m. Frank Loesser
 "Ichabod" Don Raye & Gene De Paul
 "If You Stub Your Toe On The Moon" w. Johnny Burke m. Jimmy Van Heusen
 "I'll Dance At Your Wedding" w. Herb Magidson m. Ben Oakland
 "I'll Go Home With Bonnie Jean" w. Alan Jay Lerner m. Frederick Loewe
 "I'm My Own Grandpa" w.m. Dwight Latham & Moe Jaffe
 "It Only Happens When I Dance With You" w.m. Irving Berlin
 "It Takes a Long, Long Train With a Red Caboose" w.m. Larry Marks & Dick Charles
 "It Was Written in the Stars" w. Leo Robin m. Harold Arlen
 "It's a Most Unusual Day" w. Harold Adamson m. Jimmy McHugh
 "It's Magic" w. Sammy Cahn m. Jule Styne
 "Ivy" w.m. Hoagy Carmichael
 "Kokomo, Indiana" w. Mack Gordon m. Josef Myrow
 "Laroo Laroo Lilli Bolero" w. Sylvia Dee & Elizabeth Moore m. Sidney Lippman
 "Lazy Countryside" w.m. Bobby Worth
 "Life Gets Tee-jus, Don't It" w.m. Carson Robison
 "A Little Bird Told Me" w.m. Harvey O. Brooks
 "Look To The Rainbow" w. E.Y. Harburg m. Burton Lane
 "Love Is Where You Find It" w. Earl K. Brent m. Nacio Herb Brown
 "Love Somebody" w.m. Joan Whitney & Alex Kramer
 "The Maharajah Of Magador" w.m. Lewis Harris & John Jacob Loeb
 "Mam'selle" w. Mack Gordon m. Edmund Goulding
 "Mañana (Is Soon Enough for Me)" w.m. Peggy Lee & Dave Barbour
 "Maybe It's Because I'm a Londoner" w.m. Hubert Gregg
 "Maybe You'll Be There" w. Sammy Gallop m. Rube Bloom
 "Nature Boy" w.m. eden ahbez
 "Near You" w. Kermit Goell m. Francis Craig
 "The Night Has A Thousand Eyes" w. Buddy Bernier m. Jerome (Jerry) Brainin
 "Now Is The Hour" w.m. Maewa Kaihan, Clement Scott & Dorothy Stewart
 "(I'd Like to Get You on a) Slow Boat to China" w.m. Frank Loesser
 "Once And For Always" w. Johnny Burke m. Jimmy Van Heusen
 "Papa Won't You Dance With Me?" w. Sammy Cahn m. Jule Styne
 "Pass That Peace Pipe" w. Ralph Blane m. Hugh Martin
 "Perhaps, Perhaps, Perhaps" w.(Eng) Joe Davis (Span.) Osvaldo Farrés m. Osvaldo Farrés Quizás, Quizás, Quizás
 "Please Stop Playing Those Blues, Boys" Claude Demetrius & Fleecie Moore
 "Put 'Em In A Box, Tie 'Em With A Ribbon, And Throw 'Em In The Deep Blue Sea" w. Sammy Cahn m. Jule Styne
 "Rhode Island Is Famous For You" w. Howard Dietz m. Arthur Schwartz
 "Save The Bones For Henry Jones" w.m. Danny Barker & Michael H. Goldsen
 "Serenade Of The Bells" w.m. Kay Twomey, Al Goodhart & Al Urbano
 "Sixteen Tons" w.m. Merle Travis
 "Smoke! Smoke! Smoke!" w.m. Merle Travis & Tex Williams
 "Steppin' Out With My Baby" w.m. Irving Berlin
 "Tallahassee" w.m. Frank Loesser
 "There But For You Go I" w. Alan Jay Lerner m. Frederick Loewe
 "Too Fat Polka" w.m. Ross MacLean & Arthur Richardson
 "Toolie Oolie Doolie" w.(Eng) Vaughn Horton (Ger) Arthur Beul m. Arthur Beul
 "The Turntable Song" w. Leo Robin m. John Green
 "Waitin' For My Dearie" w. Alan Jay Lerner m. Frederick Loewe
 "The Wedding Samba" w.m. Abraham Ellstein, Allan Small & Joseph Liebowitz
 "We're Gonna Rock, We're Gonna Roll" Teddy Reig, William Moore
 "What Good Would the Moon Be?" w. Langston Hughes m. Kurt Weill. Introduced by Anne Jeffreys in the musical Street Scene
 "What's Good About Goodbye?" w. Leo Robin m. Harold Arlen. Introduced by Tony Martin in the 1948 film Casbah
"When I'm Not Near The Girl I Love" w. E. Y. Harburg m. Burton Lane Introduced by David Wayne in the Broadway production of Finian's Rainbow
 "Woody Woodpecker" w.m. George Tibbles & Ramez Idriss
 "You Do" w. Mack Gordon m. Josef Myrow
 "You Don't Have To Know The Language" w. Johnny Burke m. Jimmy Van Heusen
 "You Were Only Fooling" w. William E. Faber & Fred Meadows m. Larry Fotine
 "You, You, You Are The One" w. Milton Leeds & Fred Wise m. Tetos Demey

Classical music

Premieres

Compositions
Milton Babbitt – Three Compositions for Piano
Samuel Barber – Knoxville: Summer of 1915
Lennox Berkeley – Piano Concerto in B-flat
Doreen Carwithen (Mary Alwyn) – ODTAA (One Damn Thing After Another)
Paul Creston – Fantasy for Trombone
George Crumb
Gethsemane for small orchestra
Three Early Songs for Voice and Piano
David Diamond – String Quartet No. 3
Maurice Duruflé – Requiem
Henri Dutilleux – Oboe Sonata
Einar Englund – Symphony No. 1 War Symphony
Vittorio Giannini – Variations on a Cantus Firmus
Morton Gould – American Salute
Vagn Holmboe – Symphony No. 6
Charles Ives – Piano Sonata No. 2, Concord, Mass., 1840–60 (Concord Sonata, revised version)
André Jolivet – Concerto for ondes Martenot and orchestra
Miloslav Kabeláč – Overture No. 2 for large orchestra
Aram Khachaturian – Symphony No. 3 (Symphony-Poem)
Wojciech Kilar – Two Miniatures for Children for piano
Witold Lutosławski – Symphony No. 1
Gian Francesco Malipiero
Symphony No. 5 (Concertante in Eco)
Symphony No. 6 (degli Archi)
Nikolai Myaskovsky
Pathetic Overture in C Minor, Op.76
String Quartet No. 12 in G, Op.77
Sergei Prokofiev
Symphony No. 6 in E-flat Minor
Symphony No. 4 in C Major (extensively revised version)
Edmund Rubbra – Symphony No. 5
Mátyás Seiber – Ulysses (cantata)
Harold Shapero – Symphony for Classical Orchestra
Othmar Schoeck – Concerto for Cello and String Orchestra, Op. 61
Arnold Schoenberg
A Survivor from Warsaw
Igor Stravinsky
Orpheus (ballet)
Petrushka (ballet) (2nd version)
Edgard Varèse – Tuning Up
Heitor Villa-Lobos – String Quartet No. 11
William Walton – String Quartet in A minor (1945–47)

Opera
Benjamin Britten – Albert Herring
Gottfried von Einem – Dantons Tod
Gian Carlo Menotti – The Telephone
Vano Muradeli – The Great Friendship
Ildebrando Pizzetti – L'Oro
Francis Poulenc – Les mamelles de Tirésias
Virgil Thomson – The Mother of Us All

Film
Bernard Herrmann – The Ghost and Mrs. Muir
Erich Korngold – Escape Me Never
Constant Lambert – Anna Karenina
Alfred Newman – Captain from Castile
Dmitri Shostakovich – Pirogov
Max Steiner – Pursued
Franz Waxman – Dark Passage

Jazz

Musical theater
  Allegro Broadway production
  Angel in the Wings Broadway production
  Annie Get Your Gun (Irving Berlin) – London production opened at the Coliseum on June 7 and ran for 1304 performances
  Barefoot Boy with Cheek Broadway production
  Bless the Bride (Vivian Ellis and A. P. Herbert) – London production opened at the Adelphi Theatre on April 26 and ran for 886 performances. Starring Georges Guétary, Lizbeth Webb, Anona Winn and Brian Reece. Features "I Was Never Kissed Before", "Ma Belle Marguerite" and "This Is My Lovely Day"
  Bonanza Bound Philadelphia production
  Brigadoon (Alan Jay Lerner and Frederick Loewe) – Broadway production
  Finian's Rainbow (Burton Lane and E. Y. Harburg)
Broadway production opened on January 10 at the 46th Street Theatre and ran for 725 performances
London production opened on October 21 at the Palace Theatre and ran for 55 performances
  High Button Shoes (Jule Styne and Sammy Cahn) – Broadway production
  Oklahoma! (Rodgers & Hammerstein) – London production opened at the Theatre Royal on April 29 and ran for 1543 performances
 The Red Mill London revival
  The Shape of Things! East Hampton production
  Street Scene Broadway production
 Together Again London revue starring The Crazy Gang opened at the Victoria Palace Theatre on April 7 and ran for 1566 performances
  Tuppence Coloured London revue
 Under the Counter Broadway production opened at the Shubert Theatre on October 3. Cicely Courtneidge reprised her starring role from the London production but the show closed after only 27 performances

Musical films

 Carnival in Costa Rica
 Con la música por dentro, starring Germán Valdés, Marcelo Chávez and Marga López
 Copacabana
 Don't Give Up (Tappa inte sugen), starring Nils Poppe and Annalisa Ericson 
 Down to Earth
 Etoile Sans Lumiere (Star Without Light)
 The Fabulous Dorseys
 Fiesta
 Fun and Fancy Free animated film includes Bongo and Mickey And The Beanstalk
 Golden Earrings
 Good News
 I Wonder Who's Kissing Her Now
 I'll Be Yours starring Deanna Durbin, Tom Drake, William Bendix and Adolphe Menjou. Directed by William A. Seiter.
 It Happened in Brooklyn starring Frank Sinatra, Peter Lawford, Kathryn Grayson and Jimmy Durante. Directed by Richard Whorf.
 Ladies' Man
 Linda Be Good starring Elyse Knox, Marie Wilson and John Hubbard. Directed by Frank McDonald. Directed by Frank McDonald.
 Little Miss Broadway starring Jean Porter, John Shelton and Ruth Donnelly. Directed by Arthur Dreifuss.
 Living in a Big Way starring Gene Kelly
 Mother Wore Tights starring Betty Grable and Dan Dailey
 My Favorite Brunette
 My Wild Irish Rose
 New Orleans
 Night Song
 Nora Prentiss
 Northwest Outpost
 The Perils of Pauline
 The Road to Rio
 The Secret Life of Walter Mitty
 Shadiyat al-Wadi, starring Layla Murad
 The Shocking Miss Pilgrim released January 4 starring Betty Grable and Dick Haymes
 Something in the Wind
 Song of Scheherazade
 Star Without Light
 This Time for Keeps
 The Trouble with Women
 The Unfinished Dance
 Variety Girl
 Welcome, Stranger

Births
January 6 – Sandy Denny, folk singer (Fairport Convention) (died 1978)
January 7 (or 1) – Mohammad-Reza Lotfi, Iranian setar player and composer (died 2014)
January 8
David Bowie, singer-songwriter (died 2016)
Terry Sylvester, pop guitarist and singer (The Hollies)
January 18 – John O'Conor, Irish pianist
January 19 – Rod Evans (Deep Purple, Captain Beyond)
January 20 – George Grantham (Poco)
January 21 – Pye Hastings (Caravan)
January 24 – Warren Zevon, singer-songwriter (died 2003)
January 29 – David Byron, lead vocalist (Uriah Heep, Spice) (died 1985)
January 30 – Steve Marriott (Small Faces, Humble Pie) (died 1991)
February 3
 Dave Davies, singer-guitarist (The Kinks)
 Melanie Safka, singer-songwriter
February 7 – John Weathers (Gentle Giant, Man)
February 9 – Joe Ely, singer, guitarist and songwriter
February 11 – Derek Shulman (Gentle Giant)
February 14 – Tim Buckley, singer-songwriter and musician (died 1975)
February 15 – John Coolidge Adams, composer
February 18 – Dennis DeYoung (Styx)
February 24 – Rupert Holmes, singer-songwriter
February 26 – Sandie Shaw, singer
March 3 – Jennifer Warnes, singer
March 5 – Clodagh Rodgers, singer
March 6 – Kiki Dee, singer
March 8 – Michael Allsup (Three Dog Night)
March 10 – Tom Scholz (Boston)
March 11 – Mark Stein (Vanilla Fudge)
March 14
Jona Lewie, English singer-songwriter and keyboard player
Peter Skellern, English singer-songwriter and pianist (died 2017)
March 15 – Ry Cooder, guitarist, singer and composer
March 18 – B. J. Wilson, drummer (Procol Harum) (died 1990)
March 24 – Mike Kellie, drummer (Spooky Tooth) (died 2017)
March 25
Elton John, pianist and singer-songwriter
John Rowles, New Zealand singer
March 29 – Bobby Kimball, singer (Toto)
April 2 – Emmylou Harris, country singer-songwriter
April 7
Patricia Bennett, rock singer (The Chiffons)
Florian Schneider, electronic musician (Kraftwerk) (died 2020)
April 8
Steve Howe, guitarist (Yes)
Larry Norman, singer-songwriter and producer (died 2008)
April 10 – Bunny Wailer, reggae singer-songwriter and percussionist (died 2021)
April 16
Ján Lehotský, Slovak composer
Gerry Rafferty, singer-songwriter (died 2011)
April 21
Iggy Pop, rock singer-songwriter
John Weider (John Mayall's Bluesbreakers)
April 23 – Glenn Cornick, bass guitarist (Jethro Tull) (died 2014)
April 27 – Pete Ham, singer-songwriter (Badfinger) (died 1975)
April 29 – Tommy James, singer-songwriter and producer (Tommy James and the Shondells)
May 8 – Phil Sawyer, guitarist (The Spencer Davis Group, Jefferson Starship)
May 10 – Jay Ferguson (Spirit)
May 11 – Butch Trucks, drummer (The Allman Brothers Band) (died 2017)
May 13 – Pete Overend Watts, British rock bassist and vocalist (Mott the Hoople, Mott, British Lions) (died 2017)
May 14 – Al Ciner, guitarist (Three Dog Night)
May 15 – Graeham Goble, rock musician (Little River Band)
May 16
Barbara Lee, rock singer (The Chiffons)
Darrell Sweet, hard rock drummer (Nazareth) (died 1999)
May 19
Paul Brady, singer-songwriter
David Helfgott, classical pianist
May 20 – Steve Currie (T. Rex) (died 1981)
May 21 – Bill Champlin (Chicago)
May 31 – Junior Campbell, singer-songwriter
June 1 – Ronnie Wood, guitarist (The Faces; The Rolling Stones)
June 3
 – Mickey Finn, glam rock drummer (T. Rex) (died 2003)
 – Shuki Levy, composer
June 5
Laurie Anderson, singer-songwriter
Tom Evans, rock singer-songwriter (Badfinger) (died 1983)
June 8
Mick Box, hard rock guitarist (Uriah Heep)
Julie Driscoll, singer (Brian Auger and the Trinity)
June 14 – Barry Melton, rock guitarist (Country Joe and the Fish)
June 15 – Paul Patterson, composer
June 17
Gregg Rolie, singer and keyboard player (Santana, Journey)
Paul Young, lead vocalist (Sad Café), singer & percussionist (Mike + The Mechanics) (died 2000)
June 20 – Dolores "LaLa" Brooks, singer (The Crystals)
June 22 – Howard Kaylan, rock singer (The Turtles, The Mothers of Invention, Flo & Eddie)
June 24 – Mick Fleetwood, rock drummer (Fleetwood Mac)
July 7
David Hodo, American singer and actor (Village People)
Rob Townsend, drummer (Family)
July 8 – Jonathan Kelly, singer-songwriter
July 9
Mitch Mitchell, drummer (The Jimi Hendrix Experience) (died 2008)
Haruomi Hosono, Japanese musician, singer-songwriter and record producer
July 10 – Arlo Guthrie, folk singer
July 11 – John Holt, singer (The Paragons) (died 2014)
July 12 – Wilko Johnson, pub rock guitarist, singer-songwriter (Dr. Feelgood) and actor (died 2022)
July 15
Peter Banks, guitarist (Yes, The Syn) (died 2013)
Roky Erickson (The 13th Floor Elevators) (died 2019)
July 19
Bernie Leadon (The Flying Burrito Brothers, Eagles)
Brian May, guitarist (Queen)
July 20 – Carlos Santana, guitarist
July 22 – Don Henley (Eagles)
July 23 – David Essex, singer and actor
July 24
Peter Serkin, classical pianist (died 2020)
Chris Townson, drummer (John's Children, The Who) (died 2008)
August 5
Rick Derringer (The McCoys)
Gregory Leskiw (The Guess Who)
August 6 – Dennis Alcapone, reggae deejay and producer
August 9 – Barbara Mason, singer
August 10
Dimitri Alexeev, pianist
Ian Anderson, singer and flautist (Jethro Tull)
August 14 – Maddy Prior, folk singer
August 17 – Gary Talley, guitarist (The Box Tops)
August 20 – James Pankow, brass player (Chicago)
September 3 – Eric Bell, guitarist (Thin Lizzy)
September 5 – Buddy Miles (died 2008)
September 12 – Darryl DeLoach, vocalist (Iron Butterfly) (died 2002)
September 17
Lol Creme, singer (10cc)
Gordon Edwards (The Kinks)
September 21 – Don Felder (Eagles)
September 23 – Jerry Corbetta (Sugarloaf) (died 2016)
September 26 – Lynn Anderson, country-music singer (died 2015)
September 27 – Meat Loaf, singer (died 2022)
September 30 – Marc Bolan, singer-songwriter (died 1977)
October 4 – Jim Fielder, bass guitarist (Blood, Sweat & Tears, Buffalo Springfield)
October 5 – Brian Johnson, singer (AC/DC)
October 9
France Gall, yé-yé singer (died 2018)
Rod Temperton, songwriter (died 2016)
October 10 – Norman Carl Odam, the Legendary Stardust Cowboy, novelty artist
October 12 – George Lam, Hong Kong singer and actor
October 13 – Sammy Hagar (Montrose, Van Halen)
October 16 – Bob Weir (Grateful Dead)
October 17 – Michael McKean (This Is Spinal Tap)
October 18 – Laura Nyro, singer, pianist and composer (died 1997)
October 21 – Tetsu Yamauchi, bass guitarist (Free, The Faces)
October 23 – Greg Ridley, bass guitarist (Spooky Tooth, Humble Pie) (died 2003)
October 30 – Timothy B. Schmit (Poco, Eagles)
November 2 – Dave Pegg, multi-instrumentalist (Fairport Convention, Jethro Tull), bassist (Ian Campbell Folk Group)
November 5
Rubén Juárez, Argentinian singer-songwriter and bandoneon player (died 2010)
Peter Noone, singer, "Herman" of Herman's Hermits
November 8 – Minnie Riperton, singer (died 1979)
November 10
Greg Lake progressive rock singer-songwriter (Emerson, Lake & Palmer) (died 2016)
Dave Loggins, singer-songwriter
November 12 – Buck Dharma, hard rock guitarist and singer (Blue Öyster Cult)
November 20 – Joe Walsh, hard rock singer-songwriter and guitarist (James Gang, Eagles)
November 29 – Ronnie Montrose, rock guitarist (Montrose, Gamma) (died 2012)
December 4 – Terry Woods, folk rock musician (The Pogues)
December 5
Jim Messina (Buffalo Springfield, Loggins and Messina)
Rick Wills, bass guitarist (Foreigner)
December 8 – Gregg Allman, singer, guitarist and songwriter (died 2017)
December 12 – Vin Scelsa, radio DJ
December 21 – Paco de Lucía, flamenco guitarist (died 2014)
December 27 – Tracy Nelson, singer (Mother Earth)
December 28 – Dick Diamonde, bassist (The Easybeats)
December 29 – Cozy Powell, drummer (died 1998)
December 30 – Jeff Lynne, singer-songwriter and producer (The Move, Electric Light Orchestra)
December 31 – Burton Cummings, rock singer-songwriter (The Guess Who)

Deaths
January 3 – Gus Wickie, singer and voice actor, 61
January 11 – Eva Tanguay, singer, vaudeville star, 67
January 16
Sonny Berman, jazz trumpeter, 21 (suspected drug overdose)
Fate Marable, jazz pianist and bandleader, 56 (pneumonia)
January 26 – Grace Moore, operatic soprano, 48 (plane crash)
January 28 – Reynaldo Hahn, French composer and conductor, 71
February 5 – Salvatore Cardillo, songwriter, 72
February 6 – Luigi Russolo, composer, 61
February 22 – Fannie Charles Dillon, composer, 65
March 5 – Alfredo Casella, composer, 63
March 28 – Rudolph Simonsen, composer, 57
April 22 – Charles Friant, tenor, 57
May 2 – Louie Henri, singer and actress, 83
May 6 – Louise Homer, operatic contralto, 76
May 27 – Claire Croiza, mezzo-soprano and singing teacher, 64
May 30 – Georg Ludwig von Trapp, head of the singing von Trapp family, 67
July 1 – Clarence Lucas, composer and conductor, 80
July 12 – Jimmie Lunceford, jazz saxophonist and bandleader, 45 (cardiac arrest)
July 13 – Marcel Varnel, Broadway director, 52 (car crash)
July 15 – Walter Donaldson, songwriter, 54
July 24 – Ernest Austin, English composer, 72
September 18 – Bert Kalmar, lyricist, 63
September 28 – Francisco Santiago, "Father of Kundiman Art Song", 58
September 29 – Jan Hambourg, violinist, 65
October 6
Janet Fairbank, opera singer, 44 (leukaemia)
Leevi Madetoja, composer
October 30 – Syech Albar
November 14 – Joseph Allard, French-Canadian fiddler, 74
November 26 – John McKenna, traditional Irish flute player, 67
November 28 – Georg Schnéevoigt, conductor and composer, 75
December 14 – Will Fyffe, Scottish comedian and singer, 62
December 16 – Cesare Sodero, conductor, 61
date unknown –
Ilia Trilling, Yiddish theatre producer and composer

References

 
20th century in music
Music by year